The Wisconsin Badgers represented the University of Wisconsin in WCHA women's ice hockey. The Badgers attempted to win the NCAA tournament for the fifth time, in the school's history.

Offseason

Recruiting

Regular season

Standings

Schedule

Conference record

Roster

References

Wisconsin Badgers women's ice hockey seasons
2012–13 NCAA Division I women's hockey season
Wiscon
Wiscon